Uğur Yılmaz (born 1 October 1987) is a Turkish-German footballer who plays for GSV Maichingen.

External links

 Uğur Yılmaz at Kickers-Archiv
 profile at kicker.de

1987 births
Living people
German people of Turkish descent
Stuttgarter Kickers II players
Stuttgarter Kickers players
Turkish footballers
German footballers
FV Illertissen players
Association football forwards
Footballers from Stuttgart
TSV Rain am Lech players